Coelatura ratidota is a species of freshwater mussel, an aquatic bivalve mollusk in the family Unionidae, the river mussels.

This species is found in Africa, in Kenya and Tanzania. Its natural habitats are rivers and intermittent rivers.

References

Unionidae
Molluscs described in 1885
Molluscs of Kenya
Invertebrates of Tanzania
Freshwater bivalves
Taxonomy articles created by Polbot